Akira Schmid (born 12 May 2000) is a Swiss professional ice hockey goaltender for the Utica Comets of the American Hockey League (AHL) as a prospect to the New Jersey Devils of the National Hockey League (NHL). He was selected by the Devils in the fifth round, 136th overall, in the 2018 NHL Entry Draft.

Playing career
Schmid played most of his youth and junior hockey in the SCL Tigers system. He was selected in the fifth round of the 2018 NHL Entry Draft at the end of the 2017–18 season, during which he was loaned multiple times from his junior team to professional teams within Switzerland. He moved to North America to start the 2018–19 season, playing three seasons in the United States Hockey League (USHL) for the Omaha Lancers and Sioux City Musketeers.

On 17 May 2021, Schmid signed a three-year, entry-level contract with the New Jersey Devils. Schmid made his National Hockey League (NHL) debut on 11 December 2021, in a 4–2 loss to the New York Islanders. By making his debut with the Devils, Schmid made history in becoming the first goaltender to debut in the NHL directly from the USHL. 

In the 2022–23 season, on 10 November 2022, Schmid collected his first career NHL win with the Devils in a 4–3 overtime win against the Ottawa Senators. On 26 February 2023, Schmid recorded his first NHL shutout with the Devils in a 7–0 win against the Philadelphia Flyers.

Career statistics

Regular season and playoffs

International

Awards and honors

References

External links
 

2000 births
Living people
Ice hockey people from Bern
Lethbridge Hurricanes players
New Jersey Devils draft picks
New Jersey Devils players
Omaha Lancers players
SCL Tigers players
Sioux City Musketeers players
Swiss ice hockey goaltenders
Utica Comets players